The Business Party was a political party in the Faroe Islands in the 1930s.

History
The party was founded by bank director Thorstein Petersen in 1935. In the 1936 elections for the Faroese Løgting the party received 8% of the vote, winning two seats, neither of which were taken by Petersen. In the Danish elections in 1939 it received 9% of the Faroese vote, but failed to win a seat in the Folketing.

The party merged with defectors from the Self-Government Party to form the People's Party, with its founding meeting taking place on 2 January 1940.

References

Defunct political parties in the Faroe Islands
Political parties established in 1935
Political parties disestablished in 1939